Corina Fusu (born 4 September 1959) is a Moldovan politician.

Biography 
She has been a member of the Parliament of Moldova from 2009 to 2015.

External links 
(Contrafort.md) Avatarurile transformării Radio-Televiziunii de Stat din Republica Moldova într-o instituţie în serviciul publicului 
(UNIMEDIA) Corina Fusu: În cazul în care componenţa actuală a Consiliului Municipal Chişinău se va repeta şi în 2009, atunci Republica Moldova va avea doar de câştigat 
(UNIMEDIA) Corina Fusu declară că PSD atacă PL, iar Muşuc susţine că demiterea lui Mihai Ghimpu este un pas curajos şi corect

References 

1959 births
Living people
Moldovan journalists
Moldovan women journalists
Moldovan women television presenters
Moldovan MPs 2014–2018
Liberal Party (Moldova) MPs
Politicians from Chișinău
Moldovan MPs 2009–2010
Moldovan MPs 2009
Moldovan female MPs
Recipients of the Order of the Republic (Moldova)
Moldovan Ministers of Education
Moldovan television presenters
21st-century Moldovan women politicians
Women government ministers of Moldova
Television people from Chișinău